Gastrophryne pictiventris (common name: Nicaragua narrowmouth toad or southern narrowmouth toad) is a species of frog in the family Microhylidae. It is found in northeastern Costa Rica and southeastern Nicaragua. This species is found in leaf-litter of lowland moist and wet forests. However, it is not easily seen outside the explosive breeding events. Breeding takes place in temporary pools.

Forest destruction is considered a major threat to this species, although it is not considered to be threatened as a species.

References

pictiventris
Frogs of North America
Amphibians of Costa Rica
Amphibians of Nicaragua
Taxa named by Edward Drinker Cope
Amphibians described in 1885
Taxonomy articles created by Polbot